Karin Seick (born 11 November 1961 in Winsen an der Luhe) is a German former swimmer who competed in the 1984 Summer Olympics and in the 1988 Summer Olympics.

References

1961 births
Living people
German female swimmers
German female freestyle swimmers
German female butterfly swimmers
Olympic swimmers of West Germany
Swimmers at the 1984 Summer Olympics
Swimmers at the 1988 Summer Olympics
Olympic silver medalists for West Germany
Olympic bronze medalists for West Germany
Olympic bronze medalists in swimming
European Aquatics Championships medalists in swimming
Medalists at the 1984 Summer Olympics
Olympic silver medalists in swimming
Sportspeople from Lower Saxony